Coaldale is a town in southern Alberta, Canada, located  east of Lethbridge, along the Crowsnest Highway.  Coaldale became a village in 1919 and then became incorporated as a town in 1952.

Demographics 

In the 2016 Census of Population conducted by Statistics Canada, the Town of Coaldale recorded a population of 8,215 living in 3,007 of its 3,070 total private dwellings, a  change from its 2011 population of 7,493.

Attractions 
The main attractions are the Alberta Birds of Prey Centre, the Land o' Lakes Golf Course, and the Gem of the West Museum.

Chin Lakes are located 20 minutes east of Coaldale and offer such recreational services as waterskiing and campfire pits. The Indian Hills Golf Course is nine-hole golf course and is approximately 15 minutes south-west of Coaldale. Across the road is a small campground and a lake, which is commonly regarded as an ideal place for fishing.

McCain Foods has a processing plant in Coaldale, opened in 2000.

Stafford Lake is located approximately 10 minutes east of the town.

The Coaldale Copperheads, playing in the Heritage Junior Hockey League, call the Sportsplex ('The SnakePit') home and have one of the best attending home crowds in the HJHL. They relocated from Lethbridge in 2007.

United Traditional Tae Kwon-Do Canada has a very active and well attended Traditional Tae Kwon-Do school in Coaldale.

The Coaldale Cobras (CMHA) are the minor hockey association in Coaldale.

Coaldale is home to six schools: R. I. Baker Middle School, Kate Andrews High School (winners of the Reach for the Top national championship in 1985), John Davidson School, St. Joseph's School, Jennie Emery Elementary School, and Coaldale Christian School. Coaldale is also expecting a new school on the northwestern part of town.

Notable people 
B. B. Janz, Mennonite minister
Joy Kogawa, Canadian author
Kyle McLaren, NHL hockey player
Theo Tams, Canadian Idol winner
Rudy Wiebe, Canadian author
Michael Lee Johnson, Canadian/American poet

Politics
The Coaldale Town Council consists of a Mayor and six Councillors. The current Council was elected on October 18, 2021 during the 2021 Alberta Municipal Elections. 

Mayor
 Jack Van Rijn

Councillors
 Jacen Abrey
 Jason Beekman 
Bill Chapman
Dale Pickering
Lisa Reis
Jordan Sailer

See also 
List of communities in Alberta
List of towns in Alberta

References

External links 

1919 establishments in Alberta
Lethbridge County
Towns in Alberta